Julian J. Robinson is a Jamaican People's National Party politician who has been Member of Parliament for Saint Andrew South Eastern since 2011. He is Opposition Spokesman on Finance in the Shadow Cabinet of Jamaica.

References 

Living people
21st-century Jamaican politicians
People's National Party (Jamaica) politicians
Members of the House of Representatives of Jamaica
People from Saint Andrew Parish, Jamaica
Year of birth missing (living people)
Members of the 12th Parliament of Jamaica
Members of the 13th Parliament of Jamaica
Members of the 14th Parliament of Jamaica